Ferdinand Barbedienne (6 August 1810 – 21 March 1892) was a French metalworker and manufacturer, who was well known as a bronze founder.

Career
The son of a small farmer from Calvados, he started his career as a dealer in wallpaper in Paris. In 1838 he went into partnership with Achille Collas (1795-1859), who had just invented a machine to create miniature bronze replicas of statues. Together they started a business selling miniatures of antique statues from museums all over Europe, thus democratising art and making it more accessible to households. From 1843 they extended their scope by reproducing the work of living artists and also diversified by making enamelled household objects. With the outbreak of the Franco-Prussian war in 1870 the firm briefly had to switch to cannon founding owing to the shortage of metals but resumed business afterwards. Following Barbedienne's death in 1892, he was buried in the Père-Lachaise cemetery and the firm was carried on by his nephew Gustave Leblanc until 1952.

Among the principal artists reproduced by the firm were Antoine Louis Barye and Auguste Rodin.

See also

 List of works by Henri Chapu

References

Metalworkers
1810 births
1892 deaths
19th-century French inventors
19th-century French engineers
Burials at Père Lachaise Cemetery